Salla Maaria Sipponen (born 13 March 1995 in Keuruu) is a Finnish athlete specialising in the discus throw. She finished fifth at the 2017 European U23 Championships. In addition she represented her country at two senior European Championships without qualifying for the final.

Her personal best in the event is 58.36 metres set in Lapinlahti in 2018.

International competitions

References

1995 births
Living people
Finnish female discus throwers
People from Keuruu
Finnish Athletics Championships winners
Competitors at the 2017 Summer Universiade
Competitors at the 2019 Summer Universiade
Sportspeople from Central Finland